Kalateh-ye Arab (also Romanized as Kalāteh-ye ‘Arab and Kalāteh ‘Arab; also known as Kalāt-e ‘Arab and ‘Arab) is a village in Jolgeh-e Mazhan Rural District, Jolgeh-e Mazhan District, Khusf County, South Khorasan Province, Iran. At the 2006 census, its population was 116, in 27 families.

References 

Populated places in Khusf County